The Design 1017 ship (full name Emergency Fleet Corporation Design 1017) was a steel-hulled cargo ship design approved for production by the United States Shipping Boards Emergency Fleet Corporation (EFT) in World War I. They were referred to as the "Downey-type" as they were built by Downey Shipbuilding on Staten Island. 10 ships were completed for the USSB in late 1918 and through 1919. An additional ship was completed in 1920 for a private shipping company (502 nhp).

References

Bibliography

External links
 EFC Design 1017: Illustrations

Standard ship types of the United States